Jean-Pierre Schecroun  was a French painter and art forger who made forgeries of work of modern masters, including Picasso.

Schecroun was arrested for forgery in 1962. At the time he had made eight forgeries in two years and earned around £25,000. He claimed that his intention was to expose the credulity of the art dealers who refused to buy his own work but paid large sums of his forgeries he had attributed to others.

References

External links
 Schecroun in the History of Art Forgery site

Art forgers
20th-century French painters
20th-century French male artists
French male painters
Possibly living people
Year of birth missing (living people)